Danio concatenatus  is a species of Danio found on the western slope drainages of the Rakhine Yoma in  Myanmar.

References

Danio
Fish described in 2015